Sean Patrick Shields (born 20 January 1992) is a British professional footballer who plays as a midfielder for Scunthorpe United.

Career
Shields started his career in the youth system at Tottenham Hotpsur, spending eight years with the club between 2000 and 2008. He then joined Isthmian League side Potters Bar Town, where he was spotted by Football Conference side Rushden & Diamonds as a 16-year-old and was offered a trial at Nene Park. He was offered apprentice terms at the club, scoring 18 goals in his first season with the youth side. He made his first team debut on 12 October 2009 as a 17-year-old, against Daventry United in the Northamptonshire Senior Cup. In March 2010, he decided to leave the Diamonds and re-joined Potters Bar Town for a very brief spell until the end of the season.

In October 2010, he joined Conference South side St Albans City on a one-year contract after a trial period with the club. Shields broke into the first team during the 2010–11 season after a string of impressive performances in the reserve side. However, he could not stop the club from relegation to the Southern Football League Premier Division in the summer of 2011. He rose to prominence during an FA Cup second qualifying-round match against Ashford Town, scoring a first-half hat-trick in a 6–2 victory, which resulted in Shields being nominated for the player of the round. Shields went on to make a total of 92 appearances for the Saints, scoring 21 goals, in all competitions.

On 9 January 2013, he joined Football League Two side Dagenham & Redbridge on a three-and-a-half-year contract until June 2016, after impressing during a short trial with the club. He made his debut on 26 January 2013, in the 2–1 league defeat to Morecambe, replacing Medy Elito as a second-half substitute. It proved to be his only appearance of the campaign for the Daggers. Shields, started the 2013–14 season as a back-up player, making his first league start for Dagenham in a 1–1 draw with Chesterfield. In his first full season with the club he made thirteen appearances.

In August 2014, he re-joined his former club Conference South side St Albans City on a two-month loan, having failed to break into the first team after missing the majority of the 2014 pre-season through injury. In October 2014 his loan was extended for a further month after an anonymous St Albans fan funded the deal, having been impressed with his form. In November 2014, he returned to Dagenham having scored five goals in sixteen appearances in all competitions, 13 of which were starts.

In December 2014 he moved out on loan again to the Conference South, signing for Ebbsfleet United on a one-month loan deal. It didn't take him long to get off the mark, as on Boxing Day 2014, Shields scored his first goal for Ebbsfleet United on only his second appearance for the club. It came in an impressive 5–1 away victory over Chelmsford City and came by means of a delicate 20-yard lob over the goalkeeper and opposition defender on the goal-line. In January 2015, his contract at Dagenham was cancelled by mutual consent, having made fourteen appearances for the club in all competitions. He immediately returned to Ebbsfleet on a permanent deal, signing an 18-month contract. After suffering an ankle injury during the final week of pre season in July 2015, Shields missed the first two months of the 2015/16 season. Consequently, on 2 October 2015, Shields joined Chelmsford City on a one-month loan deal from Ebbsfleet United.

On 3 December 2015 Shields signed a one-month loan deal at Margate under Terry Brown. He enjoyed a very successful loan spell, helping the team climb the table with a positive run of results over the Christmas period. He became an instant hit with the Margate fans with his trickery and exciting style of play. His first goal came by means of a free kick against Maidenhead United on his final game on loan for the club on 9 January 2016.

Shields later joined Hemel Hempstead on loan, before returning to his parent club in time to play a part in the backend of the Fleet's campaign. Despite scoring against Hemel Hempstead, and getting the equaliser in a 3–1 win over Chelmsford in which he was voted man of the match, he did not feature in the subsequent playoffs which was believed to be due to suffering a hamstring strain in training before the final game of the season against Eastbourne Borough.

However, his performances while on loan and when recalled back to play for the Fleet were impressive enough to earn him a new deal with the club, which he signed in June 2016.

Shields began the 16/17 season in fine form, scoring a superb individual goal, again against Hemel Hempstead in a 2–2 draw at Stonebridge Road. Shortly after this game and after a change in team shape, Shields adopted a left wing-back role which saw him and the team flourish during a positive run of results. This position saw the tricky wing-back pop up with regular assists for teammates and 2 more goals followed before the end of November against Truro City and Maidenhead United, respectively. He was part of the squad that finished second in the National League South that season and went on to win promotion through the playoffs.

Shields was a regular feature in the matchday squad in the 2017–18 season, but after a change in management, his game time subsequently diminished in his final two years with the club. He was loaned out to Maidstone United and Boreham Wood from December 2018 until the end of the 2018–19 season.

After a summer of interest from several clubs, he agreed a season long loan deal with Notts County for 2019–20. Upon signing here, it was agreed that Shields would leave Ebbsfleet at the end of the season, when his contract expired.

Shields signed for Weymouth on 13 October 2020 and made his debut against Barnet the same day. He scored his first goal for the club, a fine strike from the edge of the box into the top corner, against Chesterfield on 28 November 2020.

Shields enjoyed a fine first season with the club scoring 5 and assisting 14 goals, in 33 league games. On 18 May 2021, he was awarded the Player's Player of the season award.

On 1 July 2022, Shields joined Barnet on a permanent deal following Weymouth's relegation. On 2 February 2023, he joined Scunthorpe United.

International career
Shields was born in the London Borough of Enfield, but qualifies to play for Northern Ireland through his father, who was brought up in the country. In May 2013, the Irish Football Association got in touch with Dagenham & Redbridge about a possible call-up for Shields to the under-21 squad. In May 2013, Shields was called up for the 2015 UEFA European Under-21 Championship qualifier against Cyprus in Nicosia, after impressing in a three-day training camp. Shields made his debut in the 3–0 defeat, replacing Jude Winchester as a substitute. His second appearance came in September 2013, a 1–0 defeat to Belgium, where he again featured, this time replacing Kirk Millar as a half-time substitute.

Career statistics

References

External links

1992 births
Living people
Footballers from the London Borough of Enfield
English footballers
Association footballers from Northern Ireland
English people of Northern Ireland descent
Northern Ireland under-21 international footballers
Association football midfielders
Potters Bar Town F.C. players
Rushden & Diamonds F.C. players
St Albans City F.C. players
Dagenham & Redbridge F.C. players
Ebbsfleet United F.C. players
Chelmsford City F.C. players
Margate F.C. players
Hemel Hempstead Town F.C. players
Maidstone United F.C. players
Boreham Wood F.C. players
Notts County F.C. players
Weymouth F.C. players
Barnet F.C. players
Scunthorpe United F.C. players
English Football League players
National League (English football) players
Isthmian League players